José Antônio Rezende de Almeida Prado or Almeida Prado (February 8, 1943 – November 21, 2010) was an important Brazilian composer of classical music and a pianist. On Almeida Prado's death, his personal friend, conductor João Carlos Martins stated that Prado had possibly been the most important Brazilian composer ever.

Prado wrote over 400 compositions and won various prizes for his work.

He was born in Santos, São Paulo in 1943. He died in São Paulo in 2010, having lived there for the latter part of his life.

Training
In Brazil, Almeida Prado studied with Dinorá de Carvalho (piano), Osvaldo Lacerda (harmony) and Camargo Guarnieri (composition).

Upon winning first prize for his cantata , based on a text by Hilda Hilst, at the I Festival de Música da Guanabara in 1969, he continued his studies in Europe.  He studied with Olivier Messiaen and Nadia Boulanger in Paris from 1970 to 1973, besides brief studies with György Ligeti and Lukas Foss in Darmstadt.

Professional Activities

Returning to Brazil in 1974, Almeida Prado first taught at the Conservatório Municipal de Cubatão, and then, hired by Zeferino Vaz, he became a professor at the UNICAMP Institute of the Arts, retiring in 2000. After his retirement he settled in São Paulo, where he occasionally taught music courses and presented a radio program at Cultura FM.

In January 2007, his cantata Hiléia, Um Mural da Amazônia, based on the poem of the same name by Ives Gandra Martins, was performed at Carnegie Hall by the Orquestra Bachiana Filarmônica de São Paulo conducted by João Carlos Martins.

Selected works
Orchestral
 Sinfonia no. 1 (1970)
 Abertura Cidade de Campinas (1976)
 Sinfonia Unicamp (1976)
 Abertura Cidade de São Paulo (1981)
 Sinfonia dos Orixás (1985)
 Arcos Sonoros da Catedral de Bruckner (1996)
 Symphonic Variations (2005)

Concertante
 Variações sobre um tema do Rio Grande do Norte (1963) for piano and orchestra
 Ceremonial (1971) for bassoon and orchestra
 Exoflora (1974) for piano and orchestra
 Aurora (1975) for piano and orchestra
 Concerto for violin and string orchestra (1976)
 Crônica de um dia de verão (1979), for clarinet and string orchestra
 Concerto for flute and string orchestra (1981)
 Piano Concerto no. 1 (1983)
 Variações concertantes para marimba, vibrafone e cordas (1984)
 Concerto Fribourgeois for piano e string orchestra (1985)
 Fantasia (1997) for violin and orchestra
 Psalm 148 (1997) for piano and concert band
 Cartas Celestes VII (1998) for 2 pianos and concert band
 Cartas Celestes VIII (1999) for violin and orchestra
 Concerto for oboe and string orchestra (2001)

Chamber music
 Cantus Mobiles (1966) for violin and piano
 Portrait de Lili Boulanger (1972) for flute, piano and string quartet
 Livro Sonoro (1973) for string quartet
 Ex Itinere (1974) for piano and string trio
 Continuous movement (1976) for string quartet
 Macaíra: a pescaria fantástica (1977), for harpsichord and 2 pianos (or 4-hand piano)
 Paná-Paná I (1977) for flute, oboe and piano
 String Quartet no. 1 (1978)
 Paná-Paná II (1981) for clarinet, cello and piano 
 Violin Sonata no. 1 (1980)
 Viola Sonata (1983)
 Trio marítimo (1983) for violin, cello e piano
 Violin Sonata no. 2 (1984)
 Xangô (1984–85) for violin and cello
 Réquiem para a paz (1985) for viola and piano
 Sonata for flute and piano (1986)
 Violin Sonata no. 3 (1991)
 Sonata Tropical (1996) for 2 guitars
 4 Corais (1998) for double bass and piano
 Sonata for trombone and piano (1998)
 Cartas Celestes XI (2000) for vibraphone, marimba and piano
 Sonata for cello and piano (2003)
 Violin Sonata no. 4 (2007)

Piano
 14 Estudos (1962-2003)
 55 Momentos (1965–83)
 12 Piano Sonatas (1965-2004)
 Ilhas (1973)
 Cartas celestes I (1974)
 Rios (1976)
 Itinerário idílico e amoroso ou Livro de Helenice (1976)
 Cartas celestes II-VI (1981–82)
 Savanas (1983)
 16 Poesilúdios (1983-1985)
 24 Corais (1984-1999)
 12 Sonetos (1984-1999)
 14 Noturnos (1985-1991)
 Halley (1986)
 Rosário de Medjugorje (1987-2002)
 9 Louvores Sonoros (1988)
 Três Croquis de Israel (1989)
 25 Prelúdios (1989-1992)
 Quinze Flashes de Jerusalém (1990)
 5 Líricas (1994-2007)
 Cartas celestes IX-XIV (1999-2001)
 Cartas celestes XV-XVIII (2009-2010)

Choral
 Ritual para a Sexta-feira Santa para coro e orquestra (1966)
 Paixão de Nosso Senhor Jesus Cristo segundo São Marcos (1967)
  (1969)
 Carta de Patmo para coro, solista e orquestra (1971)
 Thèrèse ou l’Amour de Dieu para coro e orquestra (1986)
 Cantata Bárbara Heliodora para solistas, coro misto e orquestra de câmara (1987)
 Cantata Adonay Roi Loeçar para solistas, coro e orquestra de câmara (1989)

Publications
 Prado, José Antônio R. De Almeida, Cartas Celestes: uma uranografia sonora geradora de novos processos composicionais. Campinas: Universidade Estadual de Campinas, Instituto de Artes, Departamento de Música: 1986. Tese (Doutorado).

Notes

References
 Translated from part of the Portuguese article

Further reading
 
 Costa, Régis Gomide, Os momentos de Almeida Prado: laboratório de experimentos composicionais, Porto Alegre: Universidade Federal do Rio Grande do Sul, Instituto de Artes, Departamento de Música: 1998. Dissertação (Mestrado).
 Fraga, Elisa Maria Zein, O livro das duas meninas de Almeida Prado: uma outra leitura, Campinas: Universidade Estadual de Campinas, Instituto de Artes, Departamento de Música: 1995. Dissertação (Mestrado).
 Grosso, Hideraldo Luiz. Os Prelúdios para Piano de Almeida Prado à luz do Opus 28 de Frederic Chopin. Campinas: Universidade Estadual de Campinas, Instituto de Artes, Departamento de Música: 2008. Tese (Doutorado). 
 Guigue, Didier & Pinheiro, Fabiola. "Estratégias de articulação formal nos Momentos de Almeida Prado." Debates, n. 6 (Nov. 2002): 61–88. Universidade do Rio de Janeiro (UNIRIO), Rio de Janeiro, RJ.
 Hassan, Mônica Farid, A Relação texto-música nas canções religiosas de Almeida Prado, Campinas: Universidade Estadual de Campinas, Instituto de Artes, Departamento de Música: 1996. Dissertação (Mestrado).
 Lopes, Adriana da Cunha Moreira, A poética nos 16 Poesilúdios para piano de Almeida Prado: análise musical, Campinas: Universidade Estadual de Campinas, Instituto de Artes, Departamento de Música: 2002. Dissertação (Mestrado).
Yansen, Carlos Alberto Silva,  Almeida Prado: Estudos para Piano, aspectos técnico-interpretativos. Campinas: Universidade Estadual de Campinas, Instituto de Artes, Departamento de Música: 2005. Dissertação (Mestrado).
Yansen, Carlos Alberto Silva,  Concerto Fribourgeois de Almeida Prado para piano e cordas: um estudo para an interpretação. Campinas: Universidade Estadual de Campinas, Instituto de Artes, Departamento de Música: 2010. Tese (Doutorado).

External links
Biography (in Portuguese)
Scores by Almeida Prado at the Portal Musica Brasilis
Interview with Matheus G. Bitondi (in Portuguese)
Radio broadcast in homage to Almeida Prado: Antonio Menenses; Eduardo Monteiro; Orquestra Acadêmica: Roberto Minczuk

1943 births
2010 deaths
20th-century classical pianists
Brazilian composers
Brazilian classical pianists
Male classical pianists
Pupils of Lukas Foss
People from Santos, São Paulo